Alec Dockar (first ¼ 1920 – 1994) was an English professional rugby league footballer who played in the 1930s, 1940s and 1950s. He played at representative level for Great Britain and England, and at club level for Hull Kingston Rovers (Heritage №) and Hull F.C. (Heritage №) (World War II guest), as a scrum cap-wearing , i.e. number 13, during the era of contested scrums.

Background
Alec Dockar's birth was registered in Sculcoates district, East Riding of Yorkshire, England, and he died aged .

International honours
Dockar won caps for England while at Hull Kingston Rovers in 1946 against Wales (2 matches), and France, in 1947 against France (2 matches), and Wales, and won a cap for Great Britain while at Hull Kingston Rovers and in 1947 against New Zealand.

Genealogical information
Alec Dockar was the great-grandfather of the rugby league footballer who has played in the 2010s; Zach Dockar-Clay.

References

1920 births
1994 deaths
England national rugby league team players
English rugby league players
Great Britain national rugby league team players
Hull F.C. players
Hull Kingston Rovers players
People from Sculcoates
Rugby league players from Kingston upon Hull
Rugby league locks